James Charles Prevost (1810–1891) was an admiral in the  British Royal Navy.

He was born in Bedhampton, Hampshire, England, the son of Rear-Admiral James Prevost and his first wife France née Haultain, and joined the navy in 1823 and by 1850 was a commander aboard , flagship of Rear Admiral Sir Fairfax Moresby, whose daughter (Ellen Mary) he married on 18 October 1842, they had five children:
 Ellen Louisa Prevost (1843–?)
 James Charles Prevost (1846–15 May 1920)
 Annette Prevost (1849–1916) married General Sir Henry John Thoroton Hildyard
 George Fairfax Prevost (1851–1940)
 Edward Augustan Prevost (1855–?)

He was the Commissioner for Britain in the negotiations to settle the San Juan Island boundary dispute between British Columbia and the United States.

Prevost became an admiral in 1880, and died in London in 1891.

Prevost Island in the Gulf Islands of British Columbia and other names on it, or nearby, e.g. James Bay and Charles Rocks, were named after him. Mount Prevost, near Duncan, and Prevost Hill, a landmark on Ten Mile Point at Cadboro Bay, British Columbia are also named for him.

He was the grandfather of General Sir Reginald Hildyard (1876–1965).

See also

References

External links
 

1810 births
1891 deaths
People from Havant
Royal Navy admirals
History of British Columbia
Military personnel from Hampshire
19th-century Royal Navy personnel